"I'll Get Along" is a song by British soul musician Michael Kiwanuka, from his debut studio album Home Again. It was released as a single in the United Kingdom via digital download on 28 May 2012. The song was written by Paul Butler and Michael Kiwanuka.

Music video
A music video to accompany the release of "I'll Get Along" was first released onto YouTube on 30 April 2012 at a total length of three minutes and forty-nine seconds. The video sees Michael travelling across the UK and stopping at a diner, motorway bridge and ice cream van.

Track listing

Other versions
 "I'll Get Along" (Ethan Johns Session) – 3:47
 "I'll Get Along" (Live at the iTunes Festival: London 2011) – 3:36

Chart performance

Release history

References

2012 singles
Michael Kiwanuka songs
Polydor Records singles
2011 songs
London Records singles
Music videos directed by Adam Powell
Songs written by Michael Kiwanuka